In enzymology, a diaminopimelate dehydrogenase is an enzyme that catalyzes the chemical reaction

meso-2,6-diaminoheptanedioate + H2O + NADP+  L-2-amino-6-oxoheptanedioate + NH3 + NADPH + H+

The 3 substrates of this enzyme are meso-2,6-diaminoheptanedioate, H2O, and NADP+, whereas its 4 products are L-2-amino-6-oxoheptanedioate, NH3, NADPH, and H+.

This enzyme belongs to the family of oxidoreductases, specifically those acting on the CH-NH2 group of donors with NAD+ or NADP+ as acceptor.  The systematic name of this enzyme class is meso-2,6-diaminoheptanedioate:NADP+ oxidoreductase (deaminating). Other names in common use include meso-alpha,epsilon-diaminopimelate dehydrogenase, and meso-diaminopimelate dehydrogenase.  This enzyme participates in lysine biosynthesis.

Structural studies

References

 
 

EC 1.4.1
NADPH-dependent enzymes
Enzymes of known structure